Antoine Costa (23 October 1884 – 31 January 1971) was a French gymnast. He competed at the 1908 Summer Olympics and the 1912 Summer Olympics.

References

1884 births
1971 deaths
French male artistic gymnasts
Olympic gymnasts of France
Gymnasts at the 1908 Summer Olympics
Gymnasts at the 1912 Summer Olympics
People from Sidi Bel Abbès